Băleşti may refer to several places in Romania:

 Băleşti, a commune in Gorj County
 Băleşti, a commune in Vrancea County
 Băleşti, a village in Bistra Commune, Alba County
 Băleşti, a village in Cozmeşti Commune, Vaslui County